The 2012 United States Men's Curling Championship took place from February 11 to 18 at the IceWorks Skating Complex in Aston, Pennsylvania, (with the host city being listed as Philadelphia). It was held in conjunction with the 2012 United States Women's Curling Championship. The winning team, skipped by Heath McCormick, represented the United States at the 2012 Capital One World Men's Curling Championship in Basel, Switzerland. The first and second placed teams, skipped respectively by Heath McCormick and Pete Fenson, earned qualification spots to the 2014 United States Olympic Curling Trials, which will determine the teams that will represent the United States at the 2014 Winter Olympics.

Road to the Nationals

As with last year, teams qualified for the men's nationals by qualifying automatically through the World Curling Tour Order of Merit, through regional qualifiers, or through a challenge round. Two teams qualified via the Order of Merit, five teams qualified through the regional qualifiers, and the remaining three teams qualified through the challenge round. The regional qualifiers in Green Bay, Seattle, Grand Forks, and Laurel each received one or more qualifying spots, which were awarded to the top finishers from the qualifiers. Teams that were not awarded a qualification spot but were top finishers were invited to the challenge round, where the top three teams qualified.

The Pete Fenson rink stood as an exception to the preceding rules. Since Fenson and his team were scheduled to represent the United States in the 2012 USA-Brazil Challenge, which was cancelled, they received an automatic berth into the nationals, regardless of their Order of Merit standing. Because they were not one of the top two Order of Merit teams, the Fenson rink participated as the eleventh team in the nationals.

Teams
Eleven teams participated in the national championship, one more team than usual, due to the Fenson rink's scheduled participation in the USA-Brazil Challenge. The teams are listed as follows:

Round-robin standings
Final round-robin standings

Round-robin results
All times listed in Eastern Standard Time.

Draw 1
Saturday, February 11, 8:30 pm

Draw 2
Sunday, February 12, 12:00 pm

Draw 3
Sunday, February 12, 8:00 pm

Draw 4
Monday, February 13, 12:00 pm

Draw 5
Monday, February 13, 8:00 pm

Draw 6
Tuesday, February 14, 8:00 am

Draw 7
Tuesday, February 14, 4:00 pm

Draw 8
Wednesday, February 15, 8:00 am

Draw 9
Wednesday, February 15, 4:00 pm

Draw 10
Thursday, February 16, 8:00 am

Draw 11
Thursday, February 16, 12:00 pm

Playoffs

1 vs. 2 game
Friday, February 17, 12:00 pm

3 vs. 4 game
Friday, February 17, 12:00 pm

Semifinal
Friday, February 17, 8:00 pm

Championship final
Saturday, February 18, 3:00 pm

References

External links
2012 Nationals Home
USA Curling Home

2012 in curling
United States National Curling Championships
Curling in Pennsylvania